Hears Premears, Vol. 1: Music from Disney Channel Original Movies is a compilation album of various songs featured in Disney Channel Original Movies. Released on November 16, 1999 by Hollywood Records, at least one song from a Disney Channel film released at the time (between 1997–1999) is represented on the compilation, with the exception of Halloweentown. Despite the implications of the title, no direct follow-up volumes were released, until a very similar compilation, Disney Channel Hits: Take 2 (2005), was released over five years later.

Track listing 
"Sooner or Later" - Fastball (from Brink!)
"C'est la Vie" - B*Witched (from Smart House)
"Slam Dunk (Da Funk)" - 5ive (from Smart House)
"House Is Jumpin'" - Chane Andre (from Smart House)
"Life Jacket" - Simon Says (from Johnny Tsunami)
"Crystal 52" - Jeffries Fan Club (from Johnny Tsunami)
"So Down" - Jesse Camp (from Johnny Tsunami)
"The Prince You Charmed  " - Youngstown (from Genius)
"Charlie Sees Claire" (score) - Peter Manning Robinson (from Genius)
"Supernova Girl" - Kristian Rex (from Zenon: Girl of the 21st Century)
"Zenon Main Title" (score) - Phil Marshall (from Zenon: Girl of the 21st Century)
"My Thirteenth Year" - Randy Crenshaw (from The Thirteenth Year)
"Off to the Mall" (score) - David Michael Frank (from You Lucky Dog)
"Get Down Tonight" - KC and the Sunshine Band (from Under Wraps)
"Boogie Wonderland" - Earth, Wind & Fire (from Don't Look Under the Bed)
"Monster Groove" - Mark Mothersbaugh & Bruce Berman (from Can of Worms)
"Telephone Number" - Rich Creamy Paint (from Horse Sense)

References 

1999 compilation albums
Hollywood Records compilation albums
Television soundtracks